The 2022 United States House of Representatives elections in Idaho were held on November 8, 2022, to elect the two U.S. representatives from the state of Idaho, one from both of the state's congressional districts. The elections coincided with other elections to the House of Representatives, elections to the United States Senate and various state and local elections.

Overview

District 1

The 1st district takes in the Idaho Panhandle and the western Boise area. The incumbent is Republican Russ Fulcher, who was re-elected with 67.8% of the vote in 2020.

Republican primary

Candidates

Nominee
Russ Fulcher, incumbent U.S. Representative

Withdrew
Brian Lenney

Endorsements

Results

Democratic primary

Candidates

Nominee
Kaylee Peterson

Results

Libertarian primary

Candidates

Replacement nominee
Darian Drake

Withdrew after nomination 
Joe Evans, U.S. Army veteran and nominee for this district in 2020

Endorsements

Results

General election

Predictions

Results

District 2

The 2nd district encompasses eastern and northern Boise, as well as Eastern Idaho. The incumbent is Republican Mike Simpson, who was re-elected with 64.1% of the vote in 2020.

Republican primary

Candidates

Nominee
Mike Simpson, incumbent U.S. Representative

Eliminated in primary
Flint Christensen
Daniel Algiers Lucas Levy
Chris Porter
Bryan Smith, attorney, businessman, and candidate for this district in 2014

Withdrawn
Matthew Sather

Endorsements

Results

Democratic primary

Candidates

Nominee
Wendy Norman, teacher

Results

General election

Predictions

Results

References

External links
Official campaign websites for 1st district candidates
Joe Evans (L) for Congress
Russ Fulcher (R) for Congress
Kaylee Peterson (D) for Congress

Official campaign websites for 2nd district candidates
Wendy Norman (D) for Congress
Mike Simpson (R) for Congress

2022
Idaho
United States House of Representatives